Devil's Cavaliers is a 1959 Italian adventure film directed by Siro Marcellini, similar in theme and style to The Three Musketeers. Frank Latimore played the hero, Captain Stiller, and Gianna Maria Canale plays the Baroness Elaine of Faldone.

Plot summary 
It's the year 1555: France is upset by religious and political struggles. At the court of Henry II, dominated by his wife, Caterina dei Medici, intrigue reigns. In the southern provinces the Huguenots try to undermine the King's authority by any means, pushing the nobles to escape central power. In the Dauphiné the Duke of Vars tries to draw from the situation to satisfy his ambitious aims: he would like to take over the region and marry Louise of Valency: But the girl hates him and when, after years of absence, Riccardo returns home, back from wars of Spain, she invites him to fight with her against the Duke. Riccardo returned to sell his lands, having decided to move to Paris; but the love for his old childhood companion distracts him from his purpose. To the power of the Duke he opposes his cunning and his courage: four comrades in arms help him in the fight against the tyrant, whom Riccardo eventually kills after a fierce duel.

Cast 
Frank Latimore as Capt. Richard Stiller
Emma Danieli as Countess Louise Valance
Gianna Maria Canale as Baroness Elaine of Faldone
Gabriella Pallotta as Guiselle, Louise's Maid
Anthony Steffen as Richmond
Andrea Aureli as Duk of Vas
Federica Ranchi as Derolia the Bar Maid
Franco Fantasia as Duneil the Swordsman
Mirko Ellis as Paul, Stiller Henchman
José Jaspe as Jermaine, Stiller Henchman
Oreste Lionello
Andrea Fantasia
Carlo Bressan
Pasquale De Filippo
Franco Diana
Fedele Gentile
Loris Gizzi
Lea Monaco
Nino Musco
Bruno Parisio
Andrea Scotti
Nunzio Gallo as Count Henri Valance, Louise's Brother

External links 

1959 films
Italian adventure films
1950s Italian-language films
Films directed by Siro Marcellini
Films set in the 16th century
Films set in France
1950s Italian films